The Kohlhagen Building is a historic commercial building located in downtown Roseburg, Oregon, United States. It was built between 1906 and 1912.

The building was listed on the National Register of Historic Places in 1997.

See also
National Register of Historic Places listings in Douglas County, Oregon

References

External links

1906 establishments in Oregon
Buildings and structures completed in 1906
Buildings and structures in Roseburg, Oregon
Commercial Style architecture in the United States
Individually listed contributing properties to historic districts on the National Register in Oregon
Italianate architecture in Oregon
National Register of Historic Places in Douglas County, Oregon